Manjarabad fort is a star fort built in 1792 by Tipu Sultan the then Sarvadhakari/ruling on behalf of Mysore King of Mysore  following French star-shaped fort designs made popular by Sébastien Le Prestre de Vauban that deflect cannon fire and allow guns to cover all approaches without dead positions. It is in the Hassan district in the Indian state of Karnataka.

Location

 
On a clear day, even Arabian sea can also be seen from the fort.

History
Tipu Sultan built the fort in 1792 at a time when he was establishing his sovereignty over Mysore, fighting against other South Indian dynasties. At this time even the Marathas and the Nizam of Hyderabad had aligned with the British. The Sultan wanted to make the highway between Mangalore and Coorg secure for his expansion programmes. Because he was allied with the French at that time against the British, he sought the help of French engineers to build a star fort of the European style.

The completed fort was inspected by Tipu Sultan who then found it enveloped in fog and hence named it as Manjarabad fort; the name Manjara is a version of 'manju' meaning "fog or mist" in Kannada.
The fort was built in only one day (24 hrs) by his soldiers.

Features
The fort, as built and existing, is an eight-pointed star. The external walls of the fort have been built with granite stones and lime mortar while the interior buildings, which accommodate army barracks, armoury, stores  and others, have been built with fired bricks. Apart from these, two cellars were built next to a deep well which were underground structures used to store gunpowder, and these rooms remained cool even during summer months. The fort has sloping walls. It is said that the fort is "the most complete Vaubanesque star-shaped fort in India".

Tourism is not well developed in the area. The Tourism Department of Karnataka, pressed by demands from local people of Sakaleshpura, have plans to create basic amenities around the fort and also develop a park.

References

Bibliography

External links

Forts in Karnataka
Buildings and structures in Hassan district
Military installations established in 1792
1792 establishments in India
Tourist attractions in Hassan district